Snehal Sampat Salunkhe is a Kabaddi player from India. She was a member of the Indian team that won a gold medal at the 2010 Asian games held in Guangzhou.

References

Living people
Indian kabaddi players
Asian Games medalists in kabaddi
Kabaddi players at the 2010 Asian Games
Asian Games gold medalists for India
Medalists at the 2010 Asian Games
Year of birth missing (living people)